Redhill railway station serves the town of Redhill, Surrey, England. It is managed by Southern, and is also served by Thameslink and GWR.

History 
The local topography determined that it was cheaper to build and operate a railway line between London and Brighton which by-passed the parliamentary borough and long-established market town of Reigate and instead passed through the nearby Redstone or Red Hill gap in the Reigate Foreign (countryside) parish. According to the Acts of Parliament establishing railways between London and Brighton, and London and Dover, the line was to be shared between Croydon and Red Hill after which these two would deviate. The London and Brighton Railway (L&BR) constructed the new line during 1840 and 1841, with the South Eastern Railway (SER) contributing half of the construction cost and taking ownership of the section between Croydon and Red Hill. (The SER had however been running services over the line since 1842.) The inevitable and continuing conflict between the two railway companies over the use of this joint line gave rise to the construction of four railway stations at the site of what was then a hamlet on the eastern side of Reigate.

Red Hill and Reigate Road (London & Brighton Railway) station

The original station was opened by the London and Brighton Railway on 12 July 1841 on a site to the south of the proposed junction with the South Eastern Main Line to Dover. The nearby market town was served by a horse-drawn omnibus service operated by the railway. This station was designed by the architect David Mocatta, and was one of a series of standardised modular buildings used by the railway. It closed on 15 April 1844, when the LBR began to share the SER Redhill and Reigate station and was demolished soon afterwards.

Redhill/Reigate (SER) stations
On 26 May 1842 the SER opened what was originally called 'Redhill', but later misleadingly renamed 'Reigate' station, on their own stretch of line just beyond the junction. Passengers transferring between the two railways did so at the old Merstham station further up the line. The SER wanted to replace their 'Reigate' station with a joint station immediately before the junction, but the L&BR opposed the plan. As a result, the SER forced the issue by ending the arrangements at Merstham, thereby forcing passengers to transfer between the two stations at Redhill by foot.

Redhill and Reigate station
On 15 April 1844 the SER built a new station at the present site, named 'Redhill and Reigate' which was to be used by both railways as the interchange station. On the same day the two existing stations were closed. The branch line to Reigate was opened in 1849 with a new station called Reigate Town. Nevertheless, the London Brighton and South Coast Railway (the successor of the L&BR) continued to operate the omnibus service for its own passengers.

Redhill Junction station

The SER 'Redhill and Reigate' station was rebuilt and enlarged on the same site in August 1858 when it was renamed 'Redhill Junction'. The chronic congestion at the station was however eased after 1 May 1868 when Redhill ceased to be on the South Eastern Main Line to Dover following the opening of the 'Sevenoaks cut off' line between St Johns and Tonbridge railway station. A ten-year agreement between the SER and the London Brighton and South Coast Railway (LBSCR the successor to the L&BR after July 1846) over the use of the station and lines to Coulsdon was signed 1 February 1869 and renewed ten years later. 

During the 1880s, as traffic increased, the disputes over the use of line and Redhill station re-occurred. This became known as the 'Southern Lines Controversy' and ultimately led to the construction of the Quarry Line by the LB&SCR in 1899, which avoided Redhill. The LB&SCR diverted many of its Brighton Main Line trains to the new line, but retained running powers over the original line and the use of Redhill station. These were continued until both the SER and the LBSCR came under the ownership of the Southern Railway 1 January 1923 and the name of the joint station was changed to Redhill in July 1929.

Electrification

The Brighton Main Line and the line from Redhill to Reigate were both electrified under the Southern Railway on 1 January 1933. The Redhill to Tonbridge Line was electrified under British Rail in 1993.

Description 

Redhill station is at the junction of the Brighton Main Line, which runs north to London and south to Gatwick Airport and Brighton, with the ex-SER North Downs Line, which runs west to Guildford and Reading, and the Redhill to Tonbridge Line, to the east

The station has four passenger platforms and a parcels bay (which is now out of use). From west to east: platform 0 is the most recently built (which accounts for its unusual numbering) and serves destinations including Bedford, Reading, London Victoria and Reigate; platforms 1 and 2 are an island; there are two through lines between platforms 2 and 3; platform 3 and the old parcels dock are on the eastern side with a secondary entrance/exit. All passenger platforms are of 12 car length, and all are subdivided into 'a' (north end) and 'b' (south end). Platform 1 is a bay platform with no northbound access; otherwise all platforms have access to all routes. There is no access from either through line to or from the North Downs Line – all traffic from this direction must pass through a platform.

Platforms are linked by a subway, and by an out-of use parcels/staff bridge.  There are lifts from the platforms to the subway and a level entrance from the Platform 3 exit, with a further lift between the subway and the main entrance, which is at street level.  The main entrance faces the town centre, and is opposite Redhill bus station.

The ticket office is staffed and also has ticket machines, and there are ticket barriers. There is a coffee shop in the ticket hall, and a takeaway-only coffee shop on platforms 1 and 2.

Services 

Services at Redhill are operated by Southern, Thameslink and Great Western Railway.

The typical off-peak service Monday to Saturday is:

Southern 
 2 tph to 
 2 tph to 
 1 tph to 

Southern services at Redhill are operated using  EMUs.

Thameslink 
 2 tph to  via 
 2 tph to 
 2 tph to Three Bridges via Gatwick Airport
 2 tph to  via Gatwick Airport

Thameslink also operate an hourly night service between Bedford and Three Bridges although this service does not call at London Bridge.

Thameslink services at Redhill are operated using  EMUs.

Great Western Railway 
 2 tph to  via  (1 semi-fast, 1 stopping)
 1 tph to Gatwick Airport
Great Western Railway services at Redhill are operated using  and  DMUs.

Sunday services 
The typical Sunday service in trains per hour is:

Southern 
On Sundays, the Southern service from Reigate to London Victoria is reduced to 1 train per hour. To maintain 2 trains per hour to Victoria, the hourly services originating from Portsmouth Harbour and Bognor Regis are routed via Redhill.

 2 tph to London Victoria
 1 tph to Reigate
 1 tph to Portsmouth Harbour and Bognor Regis (Dividing at Barnham)
 1 tph to Tonbridge

Thameslink 
Thameslink Peterborough to Horsham services ceases to run on Sundays and are instead replaced by an hourly London Bridge to Horsham service. The Bedford to Three Bridges service is reduced to hourly, and its service pattern altered. 

 1 tph to London Bridge
 1 tph to Bedford
 1 tph to Horsham
 1 tph to Three Bridges

Great Western Railway 
The Great Western Railway services from Redhill remain largely the same with 2 trains per hour to Reading (1 semi fast, 1 stopping). However, there are no hourly extensions to Gatwick Airport. 

 2 tph to Reading (1 semi-fast, 1 stopping)

Platform Layout 
Redhill Station has four platforms, one of which is a bay platform.

 Platform 0 – Semi-fast services to Reading, some services to London Victoria and very few southbound services to Reigate.
 Platform 1 – South facing bay platform with stopping services to Reading and trains towards Tonbridge.
 Platform 2 – All northbound Thameslink services and the majority of services to London Victoria.
 Platform 3 – All southbound Thameslink services and majority of trains to Reigate.

Oyster extension 
On 11 January 2016, payment using Oyster and contactless payment cards was introduced at Redhill, as part of the Oyster extension from Merstham to Gatwick Airport. The station is outside the London Fare Zone area, and special fares apply.

Some Oyster photocards (as well as Freedom Passes) are not valid on the Gatwick Airport extension. The nearest station that these cards can be used is Coulsdon South only in the northbound direction.

Motive power depot
An engine shed, turntable and locomotive coaling and servicing facilities were installed by the South Eastern Railway in 1855 in the area between the Brighton and Tonbridge lines. These facilities were rebuilt by the Southern Railway in 1924 and lasted until the end of steam in the area in 1965. The site of the depot remained in use as a stabling point for many years after this. Further sidings to the west and south-west of platform 1 were removed during the construction of platform 0 in 2016–17.

References

External links 

Southern Railway station information page

Railway stations in Surrey
Former South Eastern Railway (UK) stations
Railway stations in Great Britain opened in 1858
Railway stations served by Govia Thameslink Railway
Railway stations served by Great Western Railway
DfT Category C1 stations